The "World Scientists' Warning to Humanity" was a document written in 1992 by Henry W. Kendall and signed by about 1,700 leading scientists. Twenty-five years later, in November 2017, 15,364 scientists signed "World Scientists' Warning to Humanity: A Second Notice" written by William J. Ripple and seven  co-authors calling for, among other things, human population planning, and drastically diminishing per capita consumption of fossil fuels, meat, and other resources. The second notice has more scientist cosigners and formal supporters than any other journal article ever published.

First publication
In late 1992, the late Henry W. Kendall, a former chair of the board of directors of the Union of Concerned Scientists (UCS), wrote the first warning, "World Scientists' Warning to Humanity", which begins: "Human beings and the natural world are on a collision course." A majority of the Nobel Prize laureates in the sciences signed the document; about 1,700 of the world's leading scientists appended their signature.

It was sometimes offered in opposition to the Heidelberg Appeal—also signed by numerous scientists and Nobel laureates earlier in 1992—which begins by criticizing "an irrational ideology which is opposed to scientific and industrial progress, and impedes economic and social development." This document was often cited by those who oppose theories relating to climate change.

In contrast, the UCS-led petition contains specific recommendations: "We must, for example, move away from fossil fuels to more benign, inexhaustible energy sources to cut greenhouse gas emissions and the pollution of our air and water.  ...  We must stabilize population."

Second Notice
In November 2017, 15,364 scientists signed "World Scientists' Warning to Humanity: A Second Notice" written by lead author professor of ecology, William J. Ripple of Oregon State University, along with 7 co-authors calling for, among other things, limiting population growth, and drastically diminishing per capita consumption of fossil fuels, meat, and other resources. The second notice included 9 time-series graphs of key indicators, each correlated to a specific issue mentioned in the original 1992 warning, to show that most environmental issues are continuing to trend in the wrong direction, most with no discernible change in rate. The article included 13 specific steps humanity could take to transition to sustainability.

The second notice has more scientist cosigners and formal supporters than any other journal article ever published. The full warning was published in BioScience and it can still be endorsed on the Scientists Warning website.

2019 warning on climate change and 2021 and 2022 updates
In November 2019, a group of more than 11,000 scientists from 153 countries named climate change an "emergency" that would lead to "untold human suffering" if no big shifts in action take place:

 
The emergency declaration emphasized that economic growth and population growth "are among the most important drivers of increases in  emissions from fossil fuel combustion" and that "we need bold and drastic transformations regarding economic and population policies".

A 2021 update to the 2019 climate emergency declaration focuses on 31 planetary vital signs (including greenhouse gases and temperature, rising sea levels, energy use, ice mass, ocean heat content, Amazon rainforest loss rate, etc), and recent changes to them. Of these, 18 are reaching critical levels. The COVID-19 lockdowns, which reduced transportation and consumption levels, had very little impact on mitigating or reversing these trends. The authors say only profound changes in human behavior can meet these challenges and emphasize the need to move beyond the idea that global heating is a stand alone emergency, and is one facet of the worsening environmental crisis. This necessitates the need for transformational system changes and to focus on the root cause of these crises, the vast human overexploitation of the earth, rather than just addressing symptom relief. They point to six areas where fundamental changes need to be made:

(1) energy — eliminating fossil fuels and shifting to renewables; (2) short-lived air pollutants — slashing black carbon (soot), methane, and hydrofluorocarbons; (3) nature — restoring and permanently protecting Earth's ecosystems to store and accumulate carbon and restore biodiversity; (4) food — switching to mostly plant-based diets, reducing food waste, and improving cropping practices; (5) economy — moving from indefinite GDP growth and overconsumption by the wealthy to ecological economics and a circular economy, in which prices reflect the full environmental costs of goods and services; and (6) human population — stabilizing and gradually reducing the population by providing voluntary family planning and supporting education and rights for all girls and young women, which has been proven to lower fertility rates.

At the 30th anniversary of the World Scientists' Warning to Humanity, a second update to the climate emergency declaration concluded that "We are now at 'code red' on planet Earth".

2022 warning on population
In October 2022, Eileen Crist, William J. Ripple, Paul R. Ehrlich, William E. Rees, and Christopher Wolf all contributed to the Scientists' warning on population, published by Science of the Total Environment as "part of the ongoing series of scientists' warning publications," to address the negative impacts of population size and growth on the climate and biodiversity, which they posit "continues to be ignored, sidestepped, or denied." It calls for two actions that, if heeded, will stop population growth before the end of this century. Firstly, the authors issue a global appeal to all adults to have no more than one child as part of the transformative changes needed to mitigate both climate change and biodiversity loss. Secondly, the warning urges policy-makers to "implement population policies with two key female empowerment components," primarily improving education for young women and girls and providing high-quality family-planning services to all. It emphasizes that "the combination of institutional support to plan one's child-bearing choices and educational attainment, including enhanced opportunity for higher education for women, yields immediate fertility declines." It also posits that a sustainable human population, which according to environmental analysts is "one enjoying a modest, equitable middle-class standard of living on a planet retaining its biodiversity and with climate-related adversities minimized," is between 2 and 4 billion people.

The warning also advocates for combatting poverty, patriarchy and overconsumption by the affluent, and calls for a global wealth tax to be levied primarily against "wealthy nations, industries and people who have benefitted the most from humanity's massive-scale historical and contemporary use of fossil fuels" in order to expand "clean sanitation and water availability, food sovereignty, and electrification via renewables." It stresses that poverty alleviation must include the provision of basic public services, in particular healthcare and education.

Other scientists' warnings

See also

 Animal–industrial complex
 List of global issues
 Anthropocene
 Climate crisis 
 Climate emergency declaration
 Defaunation
 Effects of global warming
 Extinction Rebellion
 Habitat loss
 Habitat protection
 Holocene extinction
 Human impact on the environment
 Human overpopulation
 Individual action on climate change
 Plant-based diet
 Scientists for Future
 Scientists for Extinction Rebellion

References

Excerpts and notes

Citations

Bibliography

External links 
World Scientists Warning to Humanity (2017)
"World Scientists' Warning to Humanity" (1992)
Our Best Point the Way  (2001)
ScientistsWarning.org (2018-Present)
ScientistsWarning.TV (2014-Present)
New commentary on the famous 'Warning to Humanity' paper brings up global inequalities. Phys.org. April 8, 2019.

Climate change policy
Environmentalism
Political statements
1992 in the environment
Science activism
1992 documents
2017 in the environment
2017 documents